Highways in Finland, or Main roads, comprise the highest categories of roads in Finland:
  Main roads Class I – ;   – numbered 1–39, between major cities
  Main roads Class II – ;  – numbered 40–99, between regional centers

Network map

Overview
Highways numbered from 1 to 7 radiate from the capital Helsinki (Highways 2, 5 and 6 diverge from 1, 4 and 7, respectively), while highways 8 to 10 radiate from Turku on the south-western coast of Finland. Highways 11 and 12 originate in Tampere. The rest of the highways start from other major cities.

Sections of highways between major cities have often been upgraded to motorways, for example between Helsinki and Tampere. Since Finland is a large and sparsely populated country, there is no reason to upgrade all highways to motorways.

The motorway network totals .

List of current highways 

 Valtatie 1 Helsinki − Nummela − Salo − Turku
 Helsinki − Turku
 Valtatie 2 Palojärvi (Vihti) − Forssa − Huittinen − Pori
 Vihti (1 km)
 Valtatie 3 Helsinki − Hämeenlinna − Tampere − Parkano − Jalasjärvi − Vaasa
 Vantaa − Tampere - Ylöjärvi
 Helsingby (Korsholm) − Vaasa
 Valtatie 4 Helsinki − Lahti − Heinola − Jyväskylä − Oulu − Rovaniemi − Utsjoki
 Helsinki − Heinola
 Vaajakoski − Jyväskylä − Kirri
 Liminka − Oulu – Haukipudas
 Marostenmäki (Simo) − Kemi − Keminmaa (20,9 km)
 Valtatie 5 Heinola − Mikkeli − Kuopio − Kajaani − Kuusamo − Kemijärvi − Sodankylä
 Lusi, Heinola (3 km)
 Vehmasmäki − Kuopio
 Kuopio − Siilinjärvi
 Valtatie 6 Koskenkylä (Loviisa) − Kouvola − Lappeenranta − Joensuu − Kajaani
 Mansikkala − Kaukopää (Imatra)
 Reijola − Käpykangas (Joensuu) (10,8 km) 
 Valtatie 7 Helsinki − Porvoo − Kotka − Vaalimaa (Virolahti)
 Helsinki − Kotka − Vaalimaa
 Valtatie 8 Turku − Pori − Vaasa − Nykarleby − Kokkola − Liminka
 Turku − Nousiainen
 Korsholm − Vaasa (shared with valtatie 3)
 Valtatie 9 Turku − Loimaa − Tampere − Jyväskylä − Kuopio − Joensuu − Tohmajärvi
 Turku − Lieto
 Viiala − Tampere
 Kuopio − Siilinjärvi (part of Valtatie 5)
 Ylämylly (Liperi) − Reijola (Joensuu) (21 km)
 Valtatie 10 Turku − Forssa − Hämeenlinna − Tuulos
 Valtatie 11 Nokia − Pori
 Valtatie 12 Rauma − Huittinen − Tampere − Lahti − Kouvola
 Tampere − Nokia
 Valtatie 13 Nuijamaa − Lappeenranta − Mikkeli − Jyväskylä − Kyyjärvi − Kokkola
 Valtatie 14 Juva − Savonlinna − Punkaharju − Parikkala
 Valtatie 15 Kotka − Kouvola − Mikkeli
 Valtatie 16 Ylistaro − Lapua − Kyyjärvi
 Valtatie 17 (discontinued) Kuopio − Outokumpu − Joensuu (2010)
 Valtatie 18 Jyväskylä − Petäjävesi − Ähtäri − Alavus − Seinäjoki − Ylistaro − Laihia − Vaasa
 Valtatie 19 Jalasjärvi − Seinäjoki − Nykarleby
 Valtatie 20 Oulu − Pudasjärvi − Taivalkoski − Kuusamo
 Valtatie 21 Tornio − Pello − Muonio − Kilpisjärvi
 Valtatie 22 Oulu − Utajärvi − Kontiomäki
 Valtatie 23 Pori − Kankaanpää − Jyväskylä − Varkaus − Joensuu
 Valtatie 24 Lahti − Padasjoki − Jämsä
 Valtatie 25 Hanko − Lohja − Hyvinkää − Mäntsälä
 Lohjanharju − Lohja (part of Valtatie 1)
 Valtatie 26 Hamina − Luumäki
 Valtatie 27 Kalajoki − Ylivieska − Haapajärvi − Iisalmi
 Valtatie 28 Kokkola − Nivala − Mainua
 Valtatie 29 Tornio − Keminmaa
 Tornio − Keminmaa (World's northernmost motorway)

Former highway alignments 
The former routes of the following highways differ significantly from the current ones, or have been completely abolished.

 Valtatie 2 Nummi − Somero − Loimaa − Huittinen
 Valtatie 3 Klaukkala − Loppi − Janakkala − Hämeenlinna − Pälkäne − Tampere
 Valtatie 4 Helsinki − Hyvinkää − Lahti − Padasjoki − Jyväskylä − Ivalo − Kaamanen − Karigasniemi
 Valtatie 6 Imatra − Sortavala
 Valtatie 7 Vaalimaa − Viipuri
 Valtatie 9 Aura − Huittinen − Tampere − Kangasala − Orivesi
 Valtatie 13 Lappee − Viipuri
 Valtatie 14 Parikkala − Viipuri
 Valtatie 15 Viipuri − Rajajoki
 Valtatie 17 Kuopio − Joensuu
 Valtatie 18 Sortavala − Kajaani
 Valtatie 19 Iisalmi − Pulkkila

Rings

 Ring I
 Ring II
 Ring III
 Tampere Ring Road
 Turku Ring Road

Highways in Åland 
 Åland Highway 1
 Åland Highway 2
 Åland Highway 3
 Åland Highway 4

See also
Roads in Finland
Road signs in Finland

Notes

References

External links 

 Finnish Transport Agency
 Finnish Road Administration
 Finnish Road Association
 Introduction to Roads in Finland by Matti Grönroos